California Intercontinental University (CIU) is a private for-profit online university based in Irvine, California. It was established in 1996. CIU offers 21 degree programs in a wide range of disciplines, enrolling over 850 undergraduate and graduate students.

Academics
California Intercontinental University offers students Associate, Bachelor's, Master's and Doctoral online programs in Business Administration, Engineering Information Technology, Science, and Arts. The university offers degree programs, that enable learners to complete a Master of Business Administration (MBA) in 18–36 months and a Doctorate of Business Administration (DBA) in 30–60 months. Bachelor's students may complete their degree in 4–5 years. However, there is an option to accelerate each program by taking more than 1 course per term.

Accreditation and approval
California Intercontinental University was first approved to operate as a degree-granting university in 2003 in the state of California by the California Bureau for Private Postsecondary Education (BPPE).  California Intercontinental University became accredited by the Accrediting Commission of the Distance Education Accrediting Commission in January 2009.

See also 
 List of colleges and universities in California
 List of for-profit universities and colleges
 List of American online colleges

References

External links
 Official website

Distance education institutions based in the United States
Universities and colleges in Los Angeles County, California
1996 establishments in California
Educational institutions established in 1996
Education in Irvine, California
Private universities and colleges in California
Distance Education Accreditation Commission